The Voice of Finland (season 7) is the seventh season of the Finnish reality singing competition based on The Voice format. The season premiered on Nelonen on January 5, 2018. The live final was on April 20, 2018.  The contest was won by Jerkka Virtanen.

References

7
2018 Finnish television seasons